Herat University  (HU;)  is a public university located in Herat, the capital of Herat Province, in western Afghanistan. It was inaugurated in 1988, beginning with a faculty of Literature and Humanities. The first President was Abubakr Rashed. The university has 14 faculties and 45 departments. The most popular field of study is Education/Pedagogy and around one-third of the university's 10,500 students are women.

In recent years, Herat University could manage and maintained relations of cooperation with a number of foreign Universities such as United States, Germany, Italy, Thailand, Slovakia, Iran, India and Indonesia. As a result of this cooperation teaching curriculum in faculties of Computer Science, Science, Engineering, Economics, Agriculture, Medicine, Religious and Islamic and Journalism and mass communication has been partial or totally amended and syllabi and textbooks are prepared as well.

Achievements
Herat University has graduated about 6039 specialists.

Faculty
Herat University has 16 faculties and 71 departments, the students are studying in different faculties and different fields. Right now Herat University has 457 faculty members and 17,898 students.

Herat University faculties are Agriculture, Applied Science, Computer Science, Economics, Education, Engineering, Fine Arts, Journalism, Law & political Sciences, Literature & Humanities, Medicine, Public Administration, Dentistry, social sciences, Theology & Islamic Studies and Veterinary Science.

Herat University is a major regional university and supports 4 filial universities in western provinces of the country. These universities are located in Nimrooz, Badghis, Farah, and Ghor.

Alumni

Notable alumni include:
Laleh Osmany, women's rights activist

Programs
Herat University offers a range of academic programs for credit, at the baccalaureate levels (over 100 majors) and 1 master program in Dari Literature.

Students Statistics

See also 
List of universities in Afghanistan

 
Universities in Afghanistan
University
Educational institutions established in 1988
1988 establishments in Afghanistan
Public universities in Afghanistan
Education in Afghanistan